Natalie Jo White (born 1988, Fairmont, West Virginia, United States) is an artist based in New York City. Her work is featured in several minor collections.

Early life 

Born to Parents Robert White and Gina Bombardiere in Fairmont, West Virginia. White has one sister, Elizabeth Marie White. Her upbringing was frugal, familial and religious.

Natalie White Work for Equal Rights

WhiteBox 

White is currently working on a solo multimedia exhibition at WhiteBox NY which is dedicated to raising awareness for the ratification of the Equal Rights Amendment. It is being curated by Laura O’Reilly in collaboration with Wallplay. (June 2-July 9, 2016)

Instant Gratification 

Performance art piece of White, in a plexiglass box, symbolized the lack of movement in the women's movement in America. The installation took place in the window of the Wallplay Shop (July 16-August 9, 2015)

Artists Crossing Genres 

White was honored as one of the communities foremost voices for feminist art and legislative change at Nicole Ehrlich's Rocket In My Pocket Productions, 3rd annual Women in Art benefit. (December 3, 2015)

Celebration of Women in Art 

Natalie White was featured at the second annual 2014 Celebration of Women in Art produced by Lady Gaga Producer Nichole Ehrlich, in collaboration with Brooklyn Museum's Elizabeth A. Sackler School of Feminist Art, and School of Doodle. (December 3, 2014)

Born This Way Foundation 

Featured artist in Lady Gaga’s Born This Way Foundation benefit. (December 5, 2013)

March For ERA 

Artist’s performance march in tandem with White Box New York exhibition; a 250 mile solo walk from New York to D.C. (July 2016). Artist, Activist, and Muse Natalie White Loses D.C. Court Case But Gets The Win For Women Everywhere

Who Shot Natalie White? 

A retrospective at Rox Gallery New York City. Natalie White: The Muse. 25 different artists, including White were featured.(April 2013)

Collaborations 

White's collaborations include many notable artists, including and not exclusive of:

Spencer Tunick: Installation in Munich, Germany.

Peter Beard: Pirelli Calendar, the Brett Ratner Film, “Beard at Work”.

Michael Dweck: Book titled Mermaids exhibited at the Staley-Wise Gallery, White Sands Missile Range series, French Playboy.

Elizabeth Sheill Fekkai: White is a curator with Fekkai in ESF Fine Arts, New York City.

References 

1988 births
Living people
21st-century American women artists
21st-century American artists
People from Fairmont, West Virginia
Artists from West Virginia